The following list contains a list of computer programs that are built to take advantage of the OpenCL or WebCL heterogeneous compute framework.

Graphics 
 ACDSee
Adobe Photoshop
 Affinity Photo
Capture One
 Blurate
 darktable
 FAST: imaging Medical
 GIMP
 HALCON by MVTec
Helicon Focus
 ImageMagick
 Musemage
 Pathfinder, GPU-based font rasterizer
 PhotoScan
 seedimg

CAD and 3D modelling 
 Autodesk Maya
 Blender GPU rendering with NVIDIA CUDA and OptiX & AMD OpenCL
 Houdini
 LuxRender
 Mandelbulber

Audio, video, and multimedia 
 AlchemistXF
 CUETools
 DaVinci Resolve by Blackmagic Design
 FFmpeg has a number of OpenCL filters 
 gr-fosphor GNU Radio block for RTSA-like spectrum visualization
 HandBrake
 Final Cut Pro X
 KNLMeansCL: Denoise plugin for AviSynth
 Libav
 OpenCV
 RealFlow Hybrido2
 Sony Catalyst
 Vegas Pro by Magix Software GmbH
 vReveal by MotionDSP
 Total Media Theatre by ArcSoft
 x264
 x265 
 h.265/HEVC possible

Web (including WebCL) 
 Google Chrome (experimental)
 Mozilla Firefox (experimental)

Office 
 Collabora Online
LibreOffice Calc

Games 
 Military Operations, operational level real-time strategy game where the complete army is simulated in real-time using OpenCL
 Planet Explorers is using OpenCL to calculate the voxels.
 BeamNG.drive is going to use OpenCL for the physics engine.
 Leela Zero, open source replication of Alpha Go Zero using OpenCL for neural network computation.

Scientific computing 
 Advanced Simulation Library (ASL)
 AMD Compute Libraries
 clBLAS, complete set of BLAS level 1, 2 & 3 routines
 clSPARSE, routines for sparse matrices
 clFFT, FFT routines
 clRNG, random numbers generators MRG31k3p, MRG32k3a, LFSR113, and Philox-4×32-10
 ArrayFire: parallel computing with an easy-to-use API with JIT compiler (open source),
 BEAGLE, Bayesian and Maximum Likelihood phylogenetics library
 BigDFT
 BOINC
 Bolt, STL-compatible library for creating accelerated data parallel applications
 Bullet
 CLBlast: tuned clBlas
 clMAGMA, OpenCL port of the MAGMA project, a linear algebra library similar to LAPACK
 CP2K: molecular simulations
 GROMACS: chemical simulations, deprecated OpenCL with Version 2021 with change to SYCL
 HiFlow3: Open source finite elements CFD
 HIP, CUDA-to-portable C++ compiler
 LAMMPS
 MDT (Microstructure Diffusion Toolbox): MRI analysis in Python and OpenCL
 MOT (Multi-threaded Optimization Toolbox): OpenCL accelerated non-linear optimization and MCMC sampling
 OCCA
 Octopus
 OpenMM: Part of Omnia Suite, biomolecular simulations
 PARALUTION
 pyFAI, Fast Azimuthal Integration in Python
 Random123, library of counter-based random number generators
 SecondSpace, simulation software for waves in 2D space
 StarPU, task programming library
 Theano: Python array library
 UFO, data processing framework
 VexCL, vector expression template library
 ViennaCL and PyViennaCL, linear algebra library developed at TU Wien

Cryptography 
 BFGMiner,
 Hashcat, password recovery tool
 John the Ripper,
 Scallion, GPU-based Onion hash generator
 Pyrit, WPA key recovery software

Language bindings 
 ClojureCL: parallel OpenCL 2.0 with Clojure
 dcompute: native Execution of D
 Erlang OpenCL binding
 OpenCLAda: Binding Ada to OpenCL
 OpenCL.jl: Julia bindings
 PyOpenCL, Python interface to OpenCL API
 Project Coriander: Conversion CUDA to OpenCL 1.2 with CUDA-on-CL
 Lightweight Java Game Library (LWJGL) contains low-lag Java bindings for OpenCL

Miscellaneous 
 clinfo
 clpeak, peak device capability profiler
 OCLToys, collection of OpenCL examples
 opencl-stream, OpenCL implementation of the STREAM benchmark
 SNU NPB, benchmark
 mixbench, benchmark tool for evaluating GPUs on mixed operational intensity kernels

See also 
 List of OpenGL programs

References 

Heterogeneous computing
Lists of software